Kohsar Market is a small upscale commercial area located in the north eastern sub sector of Sector F-6, Islamabad. It is partculary known for its collection of upscale cafes and European restaurants.

Incident
Former Governor of Punjab, Salman Taseer was assassinated in the market on 4 January 2011.

Shops 
 Tuscany Courtyard (Italian restaurant)
 Street 1 Café
 Table Talk café
 Gloria Jean's Coffees
 Porterhouse Brewery
 Caffè mocha
 Bistro

References 

Commercial centres in Islamabad